Wally O'Cock (17 June 1875 – 14 June 1951) was an Australian rules footballer in the Victorian Football League.

He joined Carlton in the VFA in 1896, and was their top goalscorer for the year. He continued on with the club after its move to the newly created VFL, making his debut the first round in 1897. Later that year, he was unable to obtain medical clearance before a game against Melbourne. He was then registered under the name Alfred Wallace, and managed to score Carlton's only two goals in a 28-point loss. He left the Blues in 1901 before they could lift from the bottom of the ladder.

References

External links
 Wally O'Cock at Blueseum
 
 

Carlton Football Club (VFA) players
Carlton Football Club players
Australian rules footballers from Melbourne
1875 births
1951 deaths
People from Clifton Hill, Victoria